Robert Graham (born 1882) was a Scottish footballer who played as an inside right. After beginning his career in the reserves at Queen's Park, he was a member of the Third Lanark team which won the Scottish Football League title in the 1903–04 season, as well as claiming a Glasgow Cup; he then spent the next year at Fulham, causing him to miss out on a Scottish Cup win in 1905. He returned to Thirds and played in the 1906 Scottish Cup Final, which ended in defeat to Heart of Midlothian.

Graham then reverted to English football, spending two years with Everton (where he was unable to displace the established Hugh Bolton and Jimmy Settle, was not selected for the 1907 FA Cup Final and spent almost all his time with the reserves) and one with Bolton Wanderers before joining another Glasgow club, Partick Thistle, in 1909.

References

1882 births
Year of death unknown
Footballers from Glasgow
People educated at Bellahouston Academy
Association football inside forwards
Scottish footballers
Queen's Park F.C. players
Third Lanark A.C. players
Everton F.C. players
Fulham F.C. players
Bolton Wanderers F.C. players
Partick Thistle F.C. players
Scottish Football League players
Southern Football League players
English Football League players